Farmersville Independent School District is a public school district based in Farmersville, Texas (USA).

In 2009, the school district was rated "academically acceptable" by the Texas Education Agency.

Schools
Farmersville High School (Grades 9-12)
Farmersville Junior High School (Grades 6-8)
Farmersville Intermediate School (Grades 2-5)
Tatum Elementary School (Grades PK-1)

Students

Academics

Students in Farmersville typically outperform local region and state-wide averages on standardized tests.  In 2015-2016 State of Texas Assessments of Academic Readiness (STAAR) results, 83% of students in Farmersville ISD met Level II Satisfactory standards, compared with 76% in Region 10 and 75% in the state of Texas. The average SAT score of the class of 2015 was 1390, and the average ACT score was 20.9.

Demographics
In the 2015-2016 school year, the school district had a total of 1,559 students, ranging from pre-kindergarten through grade 12. The class of 2015 included 111 graduates; the annual drop-out rate across grades 9-12 was less than 0.5%.

As of the 2015-2016 school year, the ethnic distribution of the school district was 60.1% White, 33.4% Hispanic, 3.2% African American, 0.7% American Indian, 0.5% Asian, 0.0% Pacific Islander, and 2.1% from two or more races. Economically disadvantaged students made up 52.9% of the student body.

References

External links

School districts in Collin County, Texas